Mark Flindt Haastrup (born 16 April 1984) is a Danish professional golfer.

Haastrup was born in Højby. He attended Georgia State University for two years before turning professional in 2007. He claimed his maiden professional victory on the second tier Challenge Tour the following year, and finished a consistent 2009 season by gaining his card for the top level European Tour at qualifying school.

In his first full season on the European Tour he finished at 117 on the Race to Dubai list, and got a medical exemption card for 2011 because of a broken wrist. The following years he struggled to get back on the European Tour. In 2016 he won four tournaments on the Nordic Golf League and finished first on the Order of Merit, which gave him a full card back on the Challenge Tour.

Amateur wins
2003 Danish International Amateur Championship
2006 Danish National Amateur Championship

Professional wins (7)

Challenge Tour wins (1)

*Note: The 2008 Dubliner Challenge was shortened to 54 holes due to rain.

Nordic Golf League wins (6)

Results in major championships

Note: Haastrup only played in The Open Championship.
CUT = missed the half-way cut

Team appearances
Amateur
European Boys' Team Championship (representing Denmark): 2001
European Amateur Team Championship (representing Denmark): 2003, 2005
European Youths' Team Championship (representing Denmark): 2004
Eisenhower Trophy (representing Denmark): 2004, 2006
St Andrews Trophy (representing the Continent of Europe): 2004
Palmer Cup (representing Europe): 2006 (winners), 2007

See also
2009 European Tour Qualifying School graduates

References

External links

Danish male golfers
European Tour golfers
Georgia State University alumni
Sportspeople from Region Zealand
People from Odsherred Municipality
1984 births
Living people